Michael Špaček may refer to:

Michael Špaček (motorcyclist) (1991–2009), Czech youth motocross champion
Michael Špaček (ice hockey) (born 1997), Czech ice hockey player